Joe Creek may refer to:

Joe Creek (Oklahoma), a stream in Tulsa County, Oklahoma
Joe Creek (South Dakota), a stream in Hughes County, South Dakota
Joe Creek, South Dakota, an unincorporated community in Hughes County, South Dakota

See also
Joes Creek, West Virginia